Yoshii Station (吉井駅) is the name of two train stations in Japan:

 Yoshii Station (Gunma)
 Yoshii Station (Nagasaki)